Besso may refer to:

 Besso, Ticino, a suburb of the city of Lugano in the Swiss canton of Ticino
 Besso, Valais, a mountain of the Pennine Alps in the Swiss canton of Valais
 Livio Besso Cordero, an Italian politician
 Michele Besso, a Swiss-Italian engineer